The Grand Opera House (Initially Wade's Opera House) was an opera house in San Francisco, which opened in 1874, and which was destroyed in the 1906 San Francisco earthquake.

References
 

 
 
 
 
 
 
 
 
 
 http://art.famsf.org/souvenir-program-wades-opera-house-january-17-1876-36444
 
 
 
 Wade's Opera House, later Grand Opera House, later Morosco's Grand Opera House
 
 
 
 
 
 
 
 
 
 
 http://www.artandarchitecture-sf.com/carusos-dream-causes-pianos-to-fly.html
 
 
 
 

Buildings and structures destroyed in the 1906 San Francisco earthquake
1874 establishments in California
1906 disestablishments in California
1906 San Francisco earthquake
19th century in San Francisco
1900s in San Francisco